Yoshikuni is both a masculine Japanese given name and a Japanese surname.

Possible writings
Yoshikuni can be written using many different combinations of kanji characters. Here are some examples: 

義国 or 義國, "justice, country"
義邦, "justice, country"
義州, "justice, state"
善国 or 善國, "virtuous, country"
善邦, "virtuous, country"
善州, "virtuous, state"
吉国 or 吉國, "good luck, country"
吉邦, "good luck, country"
吉州, "good luck, state"
良国 or 良國, "good, country"
良邦, "good, country"
良州, "good, state"
恭国, "respectful, country"
嘉国, "excellent, country"
嘉邦, "excellent, country"
能国, "capacity, country"
喜国, "rejoice, country"

The name can also be written in hiragana よしくに or katakana ヨシクニ.

Notable people with the given name Yoshkuni
 (1921–1997), Japanese landscape architect
 (1825–1874), Japanese daimyō
 (1681–1722), Japanese daimyō
 (1082–1155), Japanese samurai

Notable people with the surname Yoshikuni
 (1916–2011), Japanese baseball executive

Japanese-language surnames
Japanese masculine given names